Henri Marthe Sylvie Rolin (Ghent, 3 May 1891 – Paris, 20 April 1973) was a Belgian socialist politician, first part of the Belgian Workers' Party (POB-BWP) and later of its successor, the Belgian Socialist Party (PSB-BSP).

Career
Rolin served as a senator for the POB-BWP, later the PSB-BSP; a position which he held from 1932 until 1968. In 1942 he was named Minister of Defence in the Belgian government in exile, but was later forced to resign the wake of a mutiny in the Free Belgian Forces over inactivity. In 1946 he became Minister of Justice. In 1947 and 1949 he served as President of the Senate. In 1948 he was made a Minister of State.In 1952, Rolin assisted Iranian representatives in United Kingdom v Iran international Court of Justice. The Court's judgment was that it had no jurisdiction in this matter (Iran's original contention). This was a main reason leading to the coup d'état in 1953.

References

Belgian Labour Party politicians
Belgian Socialist Party politicians
Belgian Ministers of State
1891 births
1973 deaths
Politicians from Ghent
Presidents of the Senate (Belgium)
Members of the Senate (Belgium)
Members of the Belgian government in exile
Belgian Ministers of Justice
Belgian Ministers of Defence
Free University of Brussels (1834–1969) alumni